Joscelyn Godwin (born 16 January 1945 at Kelmscott, Oxfordshire, England) is a composer, musicologist, and translator, known for his work on ancient music, paganism, and music in the occult.

Biography

He was educated as a chorister at Christ Church Cathedral School, Oxford, then at Radley College (Music Scholar), and Magdalene College, Cambridge (Music Scholar; B.A., 1965, Mus. B., 1966, M.A. 1969).

Bibliography

Books authored or co-authored

 Robert Fludd. Hermetic Philosopher and Surveyor of Two Worlds. London: Thames & Hudson, 1979; also published in French, Greek, Spanish and Japanese. Currently available from Adventures Unlimited Press.
 Athanasius Kircher. A Renaissance Man and the Quest for Lost Knowledge. London: Thames & Hudson, 1979; also published in French, German, Spanish & Japanese.
 Mystery Religions in the Ancient World. London: Thames & Hudson, 1981, ; pbk, 1982,  ; also published in Greek, Japanese.
 Harmonies of Heaven and Earth. The Spiritual Dimension of Music from Antiquity to the Avant-Garde. London: Thames & Hudson, 1987; also published in French, German, Japanese; partly published in Spanish. Currently in print from Inner Traditions International.
 Music and the Occult. French Musical Philosophies 1750–1950. Rochester: University of Rochester Press/London: Boydell & Brewer, 1995; previously published in French; also published in Japanese.
 The Mystery of the Seven Vowels in Theory and Practice. Grand Rapids: Phanes Press, 1991; also published in Italian.
 Arktos (1993 subtitled "The Polar Myth in Science, Symbolism, and Nazi Survival"). Grand Rapids: Phanes Press, 1993, also published in German (two different editions), Japanese, Greek, French, Italian and Spanish. Currently in print from Adventures Unlimited Press.
 The Theosophical Enlightenment. Albany: State University of New York Press, 1994.
 Johann Friedrich Hugo Von Dalberg (1760–1812): Schriftsteller, Musiker, Domherr. Co-authored with Michael Embach. Mainz: Gesellschaft für mittelrheinische Kirchengeschichte, 1998. (In German)
 The Pagan Dream of the Renaissance. Grand Rapids: Phanes Press/London: Thames & Hudson, 2002.
 The Real Rule of Four. New York: The Disinformation Company, 2004; also published in French and Portuguese.
 The Golden Thread: The Ageless Wisdom of the Western Mystery Traditions. Wheaton, IL: Quest Books, 2007.
 Athanasius Kircher's Theatre of the World. London: Thames and Hudson, 2009. .
 Atlantis and the Cycles of Time: Prophecies, Traditions, And Occult Revelations. Rochester, VT: Inner Traditions, 2011. .
 Upstate Cauldron: Eccentric Spiritual Movements in Early New York State. Albany, NY: State University of New York Press, 2015. .
 The Forbidden Book, a Novel. Co-authored with Guido Mina di Sospiro. Revised edition, New York: The Disinformation Company, 2011 (electronic book). Print edition: San Francisco: Disinformation (an imprint of RedWheel/Weiser), 2013. . Foreign language editions in Spanish, Danish, Russian, Greek, Bulgarian, Polish, Romanian, and Thai.
 Forbidden Fruits, an Occult Novel. Co-authored with Guido Mina di Sospiro. Rochester, VT: Inner Traditions, 2020. .

Books edited
 Alessandro Scarlatti, Marco Attilio Regolo. Cambridge, Mass.: Harvard University Press, 1975 (Series: The Operas of Alessandro Scarlatti, vol. 2).
 Schirmer Scores. A Repertory of Western Music. New York: Schirmer Books, 1975.
 Music, Mysticism and Magic: A Sourcebook. London: Routledge & Kegan Paul, 1986; Harmondsworth: Penguin Arkana.
 Michael Maier, Atalanta Fugiens: an Edition of the Fugues, Emblems and Epigrams. With an Introductory Essay by Hildemarie Streich. Tysoe: Magnum Opus Hermetic Sourceworks, 1987; Grand Rapids: Phanes Press. Included a cassette tape of the first complete recording of the fifty Fugues, sung by Rachel Platt, Emily Van Evera, Rufus Muller, and Richard Wistreich. The recording has been remastered and issued on compact disc by Claudio Records. Spanish edition with expanded Introduction, La Fuga della Atalanta, Girona: Ediciones Atalanta, 2007.
 Marius Schneider, Rudolf Haase, and Hans Erhard Lauer, Cosmic Music. Three Musical Keys to the Interpretation of Reality, translated by Marton Radkai and Joscelyn Godwin. Rochester, Vt.: Inner Traditions International, 1989.
 Paul Brunton: Essential Readings. Co-edited with Randall Cash and Timothy Smith. Wellingborough: Crucible Books, 1990.
 Harmony of the Spheres. A Sourcebook of the Pythagorean Tradition in Music. Rochester, VT: Inner Traditions International, 1993; also published in Spanish (Girona: Atalanta, 2009), with illustrations and a new introduction.
 The Hermetic Brotherhood of Luxor. Historical and Initiatic Documents of an Order of Practical Occultism. Co-edited with Christian Chanel and John Patrick Deveney. York Beach: Samuel Weiser, 1995. Also published in French and Italian.
 Ésotérisme, gnoses & imaginaire symbolique. Mélanges offerts à Antoine Faivre. Co-edited with Richard Caron, Wouter J. Hanegraaff, and Jean-Louis Vieillard-Baron. Leuven: Peeters, 2001. 
 John Michell, Confessions of a Radical Traditionalist. Waterbury Center, VT: Dominion, 2005. 
 Petrus Talemarianus, Natural Architecture, translated by Ariel Godwin. Sacred Science Institute, 2006.
 The Starlight Years: Love and War at Kelmscott Manor, 1940–1948. The Paintings, Drawings and Writings of Edward and Stephani Scott-Snell/Godwin. Stanbridge: Dovecote Press, 2015. https://www.amazon.com/The-Starlight-Years-Kelmscott-Manor/dp/0992915112

Books translated
 Werner Walcker-Meyer, The Roman Organ of Aquincum. Ludwigsburg: Musikwissenschaftliches Verlagsgesellschaft, 1972.
 Salomon Trismosin, Splendor Solis. Edinburgh: Magnum Opus Hermetic Sourceworks, 1981; Grand Rapids: Phanes Press. 1991. Another version: Splendor Solis: Harley Ms. 3469. Barcelona: Moleiro, 2011, 53–69.
 René Guénon, The Multiple States of Being. Burdett, NY: Larson Publications, 1984.
 Fabre d'Olivet, The Secret Lore of Music. Rochester, VT: Inner Traditions International, 1988. Originally entitled Music Explained as Science and Art.
 Johann Valentin Andreae, The Chemical Wedding of Christian Rosenkreutz. Grand Rapids: Phanes Press, 1991. Reissued in Rosicrucian Trilogy: The Three Original Rosicrucian Documents in New English Translations. Translation of the Fama Fraternitatis by Christopher McIntosh and Donate Pahnke McIntosh; translation of the Confessio Fraternitatis and Chymische Hochzeit by JG. Newburyport: RedWheel/Weiser, 2016.
 Antoine Faivre, The Eternal Hermes. Grand Rapids: Phanes Press, 1994.
 Francesco Colonna, Hypnerotomachia Poliphili: The Strife of Love in a Dream. London & New York: Thames & Hudson, 1999 and re-editions.
 Julius Evola, Ride the Tiger. Co-translated with Constance Fontana. Rochester, VT: Inner Traditions International, 2003.
 Hans Kayser, Textbook of Harmonics. Co-translated with Ariel Godwin. Sacred Science Institute, 2006
 Marco Baistrocchi, Agarttha: A Guenonian Manipulation? Fullerton, Ca.: Theosophical History, 2009 (Theosophical History Occasional Papers, No. XII).
 Julius Evola and The UR Group, Introduction to Magic, Volume II: The Path of Initiatic Wisdom. Rochester, VT: Inner Traditions International, 2019.

References

External links 
 

1945 births
Alumni of Magdalene College, Cambridge
People educated at Christ Church Cathedral School
Cornell University alumni
English musicologists
English translators
English composers
Historicist composers
Living people
People educated at Radley College
People from West Oxfordshire District
Cleveland State University faculty
Colgate University faculty
Western esotericism scholars
Traditionalist School